The Shire of Koorda is a local government area in the Wheatbelt region of Western Australia, about  northeast of Perth, the state capital.

History
The Koorda Road District was gazetted out of land previously administered by the Wyalkatchem and Mount Marshall Road Boards on 18 November 1927. On 1 July 1961, it became a Shire under the Local Government Act 1960, which reformed all remaining road districts into shires.

Wards
The shire does not have wards but has seven councillors.

Towns and localities
The towns and localities of the Shire of Koorda with population and size figures based on the most recent Australian census:

Population

Heritage-listed places
As of 2023, 71 places are heritage-listed in the Shire of Koorda, of which none are on the State Register of Heritage Places.

References

External links
 

Koorda